Events from the year 1755 in Denmark.

Incumbents
 Monarch – Frederick V
 Prime minister – Johan Ludvig Holstein-Ledreborg

Events
 24 November – The company now known as Iver C. Weilbach & Co. A/S is founded when flag, sail and compass maker Iver Jensen Borger sets up his own maritime supplier business in Copenhagen

Undated

Culture

Literature

 27 November  Christian Winther publishes Hjortens Flugt. Et Digt.

Births
 5 February – Caroline Müller, operatic mezzo-soprano, actress and dancer (died 1826)
 3 March  Cathrine Marie Gielstrup, stage actress (died 1792)
 17 October - Envold de Falsen, lawyer, poet, actor and statesman (died 1808).
 16 November  Joachim-Daniel Preisler, actor (died 1809)

Deaths

 28 February – Johannes Erasmus Iversen, composer (born 1713)

References

 
1750s in Denmark
Denmark
Years of the 18th century in Denmark